Zephyranthes citrina, is a species of bulbous plant belong to the family Amaryllidaceae, native to Mexico.

Description 

It is a bulbous plant with green leaves dull 4 mm wide. The upright flowers with lemon yellow color, funnel-shaped from 3.1 to 5 cm, green tube. The number chromosome is 2n = 48.
It grows luxuriantly in natural grasslands and gardens in the month of July after rain. On blooming, it makes the gardens yellowish in  waterlogged plains of Punjab. Commonly, it is known as the citron zephyrlily or yellow rain lily.

Taxonomy 
Zephyranthes citrina was described by Baker and published in Botanical Magazine 108: pl. 6605, in 1882. (February 1, 1882)

Chemical Constituent 

It contains Lycorine, Lycorenine, Galanthine, Haemanthamine, Oxomaritidine, Maritidine, Hemanthamine, Haemanthidine, Vittatine, Galanthine, Narcissidine.

References

External links 

 Botanical Magazine; or, Flower-Garden Displayed... London 108: t. 6605.  1882
 : Z. citrina

citrina
Taxa named by John Gilbert Baker